This is a list of United States Army fire control, and sighting material by supply catalog designation, or Standard Nomenclature List (SNL) group "F". The United States Army Ordnance Corps Supply Catalog used an alpha-numeric nomenclature system from about the mid-1920s to about 1958. These designations represent parts catalogs for supply and repair purposes. There can be numerous volumes, changes, and updates under each designation

F1 to F99
 F1 Major items, small arms, automatic gun, trench mortar, and field artillery sighting equipment, and fire control instruments
 F2 Major items, harbor defense, railway, and antiaircraft artillery sighting equipment, and fire-control instruments
 F3 Items not authorized for general issue
 F4 Rule, slide, M1917 – Parts and equipment
 F5 Items common to two or more group F products
 F6 Aiming Circle, M1918 (French)
 F7 Instrument angle of sight, M1917
 F8 Mount, telescope, M1 (for 37mm gun carriage, M1); Telescope, M2 (for 37mm gun carriage, M1) – Parts and equipment
 F9 Telescope B.C. M1915, and M1915A1
 F10 bore sight, (small arms, and field artillery)
 F11 Setter Fuze, Bracket, M1916, M1916A1, M1916A2
 F12 Targets, testing (small arms and field artillery) – parts
 F13 Gunners Quadrant, M1918. 
 F14 Compass, lensatic, M1918 – Parts and equipment, 16 September 1927
 F15 Machine gun clinometer M1917 Parts and equipment
 F16 Sight, panoramic, machine gun, M1918 – Parts and equipment
 F17 Device, aiming, mirror, M1918 – Parts and equipment, 23 November 1926
 F18 Night lighting device, parts and equipment
 F19 Board, deflection, M1
 F20
 F21 Kit, repair optical, for field artillery equipment
 F22 Telescope, Pan
 oramic, M1917M1 (Mils)
 F23 Compass, Prismatic, M1918 
 F24 Sight Quadrant, M1918A1
 F25 Range finder, 80-cm. base, M1914; Range finder, 80-cm. base, M1916; Range finder, 80-cm. base, M1917; Range finder, 80-cm. base, M1918 -Parts and equipment, 7 December 1926
 F26 Finder range, 1-meter base,
 F27 Sights, rocking-bar (all types) – Parts and equipment
 F28 Sight, M1901 (French)
 F29 Sight, M1916, for 75 mm Gun M1916 – Parts and equipment
 F30 Sight, telescopic, 2.24-inch (6 Pdr.) tank gun, Mk.II (British) -Parts and equipment
 F31 Sight, M1916, telescopic, 37mm gun, M1916 – Parts and equipment, 18 October 1926
 F32 Sight Telescopic, M1918, M1918A2. (for 37-mm tank gun, and machine gun,) (M2 Light Tank?)
 F33 Quadrant sight, M1916, for 37-mm Gun M1916
 F34 Glass field, type EE. 6-power 
 F35 Post aiming, M1
 F36 Pocket watch, 7-Jewel, 15-Jewel, and stop watch Type B, class 15. and Wrist watch. 
 F37 Clinometer, MK.1, (degrees) 3-inch, trench mortar
 F38 Telescope, B. C. M1917B1, M1917B2, M1917B3, M1917B4 
 F39 Finder range,80-cm, base, M1918
 F40 Level, testing – Parts and equipment
 F41 Periscope, Battery Commanders, M1918
 F42 Mount, telescope, M2 (for 75mm mortar carriage, M1); Telescope, elbow, M3 (for 75mm mortar carriage, M1) – Parts and equipment
 F43 Sight, M1912, 2.95-inch mountain gun – Parts and equipment
 F44 Altimeter, M1917, M1920. ?
 F45 Depression position finder, Lewis, M1907 – Parts and equipment
 F46 Finder depression position (Swasey type AII) (Depression position finder)
 F47 Periscope, rifle, M1918 – Parts
 F48 Board rocket, M1918. (for signal rockets)
 F49 Telescope, sighting, No. 4, Mk. III (British); Telescope, sighting, No.5, (British) – Parts and equipment
 F50 Sight, M1917, for A.A. carriages (for 75m A.A. truck mount, M1917) – Parts and equipment
 F51 System, sighting, A.A. M1 (for 3" A.A. gun mounts, M1917MI) – Parts and equipment
 F52 Trainer coincidence, Type A
 F53
 F54
 F55
 F56 Indicator, wind component, M1
 F57 Rule set forward, type B
 F58 Instrument Observation M1. Telescope, M3?
 F59 Board plotting and relocating, cloke, M1923. (Plotting board)
 F60 Altimeters
 F61
 F62
 F63
 F64
 F65
 F66
 F67
 F68
 F69 Firing tables, and trajectory charts
 F70 Trainer Coincidence, type B
 F71
 F72
 F73
 F74 Eyeglasses, amber, M2. and eyeglasses, red M1. 
 F75 Board deflection Gun, M1905, M1905MI, M1917
 F76 Board, deflection, mortar, M1906
 F80
 F81 Board, range correction, M1, and M1A1
 F82
 F83
 F84 Instrument, Azimuth M1910A1, M2 (degrees)
 F85
 F86 Mount, Telescope, M9, M13
 F87 Quadrant Elevation, M1917
 F88
 F89
 F90 Telescope, Panoramic, M1918MIII (Mils)
 F91
 F92 Telescope, Observation, M1908
 F93 Kit repair optical, for harbor defense
 F94
 F95 Predictor, Mine, M1916
 F96
 F97
 F98 Clinometer, M1912, and M1912A1
 F99

100 to 199
 F100 Board plotting and relocating, M1
 F101 Tripods, all types
 F102 Board, plotting, 110-degree, M1915, and M1918
 F103 Corrector, percentage, M1
 F104
 F105
 F106 Mount, Telescope, M3, and Telescope, Panoramic, M1
 F107 Circle aiming, M1916, M1916MI
 F108 Rule Aiming, M1918 with sights
 F109
 F110
 F111 Finder depression position, M1, M2
 F112 Mount Telescope, M7
 F113
 F114
 F115
 F116 Board, fire adjustment M1
 F117
 F118 System data transmission, for director M1, M2
 F119 Telescope, Panoramic, M1904, M1915
 F120 Material, Sound locator, (T), parts and Equipment
 F121 Instrument Binaural training, M1, parts and equipment
 F122 Telescope, M1923
 F123 Telescope, Panoramic, M1922
 F124
 F125
 F126 Setter Fuze, hand, M1912, and M1912A4
 F127 Setter Fuze, hand, M1913A1
 F133 Mount, Telescope, M1906, and M1906A1, and Telescope, (2-inch) M1906, M1909
 F134
 F135 Mount Telescope, M1904A1, and M1904MIA1
 F136
 F137 Telescope, (3-inch) M1912
 F138 Mount, Telescope, M1912M1, M1918
 F139 Board spotting M2
 F140 Quadrant Gunners, M1 (Mils)
 F141
 F142 Mount Telescope, M4
 F143
 F144
 F145
 F146 Glass field type-E. 6-power, and glass field type-EE, (Navy) 
 F147 Compass, prismatic, M1918, (Keuffel and Esser type)

 F149 Instrument, Azimuth, M1918, M1918A2, M1 (Mils)
 F150
 F151
 F152 Arms scale M1906
 F153 Corrector, wind, sound ranging, M1
 F154 Board plotting, sound ranging, M1
 F155
 F156 Mount, Telescope, M6A1
 F157
 F158
 F159
 F160 Aiming circle, M1
 F161
 F162
 F163
 F164 Finder, range, stereoscopic, 6-meter base, M2
 F165 Lamp, Aiming post,
 F166 Mount Telescope, M15A1 and Quadrant range M1
 F167 Director (Military), AA., M7, M7A1B1, M7A1B2
 F168 Tester, Stereoscopic, M1A1
 F169 Mount Telescope, M16
 F170
 F171 Finder height, M1, M1A1
 F172 Telescope, 2-inch, M1909A1 
 F173 Telescope, Observation, M48, M49
 F174 Telescope, M5, M5A1, (machine gun)
 F175
 F176 Material sound Locator, M2 
 F177 Setter Fuze, M8
 F178 System data transmission, M3
 F179
 F180 Mount Quadrant, M1
 F181 System data transmission, M4A1
 F182
 F183 Telescope, M64, M74
 F184 Mount Telescope, M19 and Telescope, M6 (37 mm Gun M3)
 F185 Board Plotting, M3, and M4
 F186 Mount Telescope, M20
 F187 Pocket watch, Railroad grade. 
 F188 Instrument flank spotting, M1. and Rule flank spotting, M1
 F189 Finder Height, M2, and M2A1
 F190 System, Data Transmission, M5, M7, M8, M9, M10, M13, M14, M17
 F191 Post Aiming, M4, M5, M6, M7, M8, M9
 F192
 F193 Trainer Stereoscopic, M2, M3 and M6, M7
 F194 Clock, message center, M1
 F195 Sight Telescopic, M1
 F196 Telescope, Panoramic, M8
 F197 Mount Telescope, M21 M23?
 F198 Instrument Binaural training, M2, parts and equipment
 F199 Mount Telescope, M22

200 to 299
 F200 Kit, cable repair, M1, M2, M3, M5, and M7
 F201 Board spotting, M3, and M7?
 F202 Voltage controller, M1
 F203 Gun Data Computer, M1
 F204 Quadrant, Elevation, M1
 F205 Light Instrument, M2, M5, M9, M10, M12, M13, M16, M17, M18, M19, M23, M25, M26, M27, M28, M29, M30, M31, M32, M33
 F206 Kit, Instrument repair
 F207 System remote control, M2, and cable, M1
 F208 System remote control, M1, M5, and cable, M8
 F209 Director (Military), AA., M5, M5A1, and M5A2
 F210 Binocular, M3, M8, M9, M13 
 F211 Setter Fuze, M13
 F212
 F213 Instrument Azimuth, M1918A1
 F214 Telescope, Panoramic, M12, M12A1, A2, A3, A5
 F215 Rule Slide M1
 F216 Mount Telescope, M25
 F217 Periscope, M1
 F218
 F219 Compass, M2
 F220 Light, Aiming post, M14
 F221 Setter Fuze, M10
 F222 System, Data Transmission, M6
 F223 Mount Telescope, M30
 F224 Mount Telescope, M26, M27, M28 M47? M52C, M52D, M54
 F225 System remote control, M3, M4, and cable M9
 F226 Directors Trailer, M13 M14. and generator trailer, M7
 F227 generating unit, M5, M6
 F230 Mount Telescope, M24A1, and Telescope M18. (Ordnance QF 6 pounder)
 F231 Telescope elbow, M1, M1A1, M6, M17, M22, M34, and M58
 F232
 F233 Board plotting, M5 (for flash ranging)
 F234 Mount Telescope, M35, and Telescope, M31
 F235 Periscopes, telescopes for periscopes, and direct sighting telescopes for use in tanks.
 V1 Periscope, M4A1 with Telescope, M47A2
 V2 Periscope, M6
 V3 Periscope, M8A1, with Telescope, M39A2 for Howitzer Motor Carriage M8 also M9 periscope
 V4 Periscope, M10C, M10D, M10F, M10G, M10P
 V5 Periscope, M13,B1, M14, A1, M17
 V6 Periscopes, M15, and M15A1
 V7 Periscopes, M16C, M16D, M16F, M16G, M16H
 V8 Telescope, M69C, M69F, and M69G
 V9 Telescope, M70C, M70D, M70F, M70R
 V10 Telescope, M71C, M71D, M71G, M71K, M71N
 V11 Telescope, M76C, M76F, M76G
 V12 Telescope, M83C, M83D, M83F
 V13 Telescope, M86F
 V14 Telescope, M79E1
 V15 Periscope, M20, -A1, A2, A3, and A3C (for M41, M47, M48 series tanks)
 V16 Telescope M97
 V17 Periscope M19, and T41, night vision for M60 tank
 V18 Periscope, T25, T36
 V19 Periscope T38
 F236 Mount Telescope, M36. and Telescope M33
 F237 Table, Firing, Graphical M1 thru M20, M22, M38 to M51
 F238 Binocular, M2, M7, M14, M15, M16, M17, Mark 21 (Navy)
 F239
 F240
 F241 System Sighting, M5, M6
 F242 Mount, sight, M35, and sight reflex M18 (Quadmount)
 F243 Director (Military), M9, M9B1, and M10
 F244 System cable, M3
 F245 Setter Fuze, M14 (wrench), M15, M16, M17, M21
 F246 Instrument spotting, M2
 F247
 F248
 F249 Kit, Helium filling, M8 (for height finders)
 F250 Trainer, Director, M8
 F251 Arms scale, M1906
 F252 System Sighting, M7
 F253 Mount Telescope, M43
 F254 Finder range, M7, M9, M9A1
 F255
 F256 Mount Telescope, M42
 F257
 F258 Transmitter azimuth, M5, and elevation M6
 F259 Telescope, B.C. M65
 F260
 F261 Mount Telescope, M50
 F262 Telescope elbow, M62, M62E2, M62A1C
 F263 Mount Telescope, M40
 F264 Binocular, M6
 F265
 F266
 F267
 F268 Binocular, M5
 F269
 F270
 F271 Mount Telescope, M44
 F272 Kit, instrument repair
 F273 Gun Data Computer, M8C, M8F, M8G, M8K, M8N, M9
 F274 Amplifier, torque M1
 F275 Observation tower, M1
 F276 Sight Computing, M7, M7A1
 F277 System Remote control, M14
 F278
 F279 Clock tank, 8-day Elgin
 F280
 F281 Quadrant Elevation, M9
 F282
 F283 Generating unit, M15, M15A1
 F284 Indicator, Powder Temperature, M12, M13, M14, M15
 F285 Indicator Azimuth, M18, M19
 F286 Sight, correctional, Mk. V (Navy) (40MM Gun)
 F287 Indicator, Range, MK. 1. (Navy)
 F288 Setter Fuze, M19. (120 mm M1 gun)
 F289 Telescope, M73B1, M81, M82, M84
 F290 Generating unit M17
 F291 Generating unit, M18
 F292 Mount Telescope, M45
 F293 Setter Fuze, M22, M23
 F294 Mount Telescope, M55 (T85). M56, M57, M70, M77
 F295 Mount Telescope, M64, (T90), M72
 F296 Mount Telescope, M65, (T94), M82
 F297
 F298 Finder range, M10
 F299

300 to 399
 F300 Mount telescope T89
 F301 Mount Telescope, M59, M79,
 F302
 F203
 F304 Mount Telescope, M63,
 F305
 F306
 F307 Sight computing, M14
 F308 Sight computing, T80
 F309 Board plotting, M9C, M9D, M9F
 F310 Mount Telescope, M78, and Telescope, M85C
 F311 Mount Telescope, M69
 F312 Mount Telescope, M66, M67, M68 M73, M83, and (T116)
 F313
 F314 Board plotting, M10
 F315 System remote control, M16E1 for twin 40-MM ON M42 CHASSIS
 F316 Sight computing, M13
 F317
 F318
 F319 Interpupillometer, M1
 F320 Mount, sight, M74
 F321 Sight computing, M19
 F322 Holder telescope mount, M4
 F323 Mount Telescope, M79
 F324 Adapter, telescope, M9
 F325
 F326 Periscope, M18, M18C
 F327 Telescope, T151, T151E1
 F328
 F329 Table Graphical, firing, M39, M39A1, M40, M40A1, M41, M1A1, M42, M43 thru M57
 F330
 F331
 F332
 F233
 F334
 F335
 F336
 F337
 F338
 F339
 F340
 F341
 F342 Fire control system AA. M33C, M33D
 F243 Telescope, M91C, T152
 F344 Mount telescope, M87, T173, M87A1
 F345 Setter fuze, orientation, M24
 F346 Thermometer, powder temperature, M1, M1A1
 F347
 F348
 F349 Setter Fuze, M26
 F350 Fire control system, T38
 F351 Table, graphical site, M52, M52, M54, M55, M56
 F352 Telescope, M90C, (T127E3) M90D
 F253 Mount, telescope, M85, T158
 F354 Mount sight, M86
 F355 Azimuth indicator T23
 F356 Finder range, T46E1
 F357 Setter Fuze, M27
 F358 Mount Periscope, M88, M89, M93, (T176E1), and M94
 F359 Drives Ballistic, M4, M3, and T23E2
 F360 Quadrant, elevation, M13, T21
 F361 Sight, T149E2
 F362 Sight, bore, T150
 F263 Sight, computing, T154
 F364 Mount, telescope, M92, T178, T178E1
 F365 Transmitter, superelevation, M22, T13
 F366 Sight unit, M34, M34A1, M34A2
 F367 System, cable, M23
 F368 System projection, (7597856)
 F369 Inverter, (7633698)
 F370 Sight ring assembly (F7686524)
 F371 Mount Telescope, M96,
 F372 Mount Telescope, T179
 F273 Telescope, Panoramic, T149E1
 F374 Telescope, M101
 F375 Mount, telescope, M31 M32
 F376 Mount Telescope, M71
 F377 Drive, range, T25
 F378 Mounts Periscope, M102, and M102A1
 F379 Circle, aiming, M2, (T3)
 F380 Mount Telescope, T-169E1
 F381 Mount Telescope, M101
 F382 Telescope, M93 T153
 F283 Mount Telescope, T-159
 F384 Sight Periscope, M25
 F385 Mount Telescope, T191
 F386 Computer Ballistic, T31
 F387 Device, leveling, 8293768 for 106-MM Recoilless Rifle M40
 F388 Mount, periscope, T195
 F389 Indicator Azimuth, M20, m21, M27, M28, M30, M31
 F390 Fuze setter, M28
 F391 Telescope, elbow, M92D
 F392 Mount Telescope M90
 F293 Sight, bore, M37
 F394
 F395 sight, M39, T156
 F396 Periscope mount, M105, T185
 F397
 F398
 F399

400 to 499
 F400
 F401 Ballistic Drive, M5A1, (T24E5) for M48A2 (M48 Patton)
 F402 Periscope, M28, (T46), 1956
 F403
 F404
 F405

See also
 List of U.S. Army weapons by supply catalog designation
 Indirect fire
 Gun laying
 Coincidence rangefinder
 Sound ranging
 Coast Artillery fire control system
 Angular mil

References
 TM 9-2300 Standard Artillery and Fire Control Material. dated 1944
 TM 9-2300 Artillery Materiel and Associated Equipment. dated May 1949
 ORD 1. dated February 1955

External links
 http://vmpa.ordnancereproductions.com/ (Army Motors on line)
 http://sill-www.army.mil/famuseum/
 https://archive.org/details/elementaryoptics00unitrich (Elementary optics and applications to fire control instruments (1922)
  FM 4–15

Army fire control and sighting material by supply catalog designation
Army fire control and sighting material by supply catalog designation
Fire control and sighting material by supply catalog designation
Fire control and sighting material by supply catalog designation